Emra River is a right-bank tributary of the Dibang River which eventually flows into the Brahmaputra River. The entire valley of the river is contained in the Etalin Circle of the Dibang Valley district.

The river originates near the India-China Line of Actual Control in Arunachal Pradesh at an elevation of about 4000 m. Emra watershed/catchment area has a forest cover of 87% with high species richness and low habitat fragmentation. The Mishmi people live in the river valley/basin area. Fish such as mahseer (Tor putitora) migrate from Dibang into Emra for spawning and breeding.

References

Further reading 

  pg 40. "Emra River Valley: The northern portion of the region is a part of inner Himalayas and the southern portion that of the Middle Himalayas. The region spreads over the western parts of Etalin circle and a very small portion of Anelih circle [...]."

Rivers of Arunachal Pradesh